Eirik Sørensen (born 17 July 1984) is a Norwegian football goalkeeper who currently plays for Tromsdalen UIL.

He played youth soccer for IF Skarp and Tromsdalen, and made his senior debut for Tromsdalen in 2003. He eventually established himself in the first team. He was loaned out to regional greats Tromsø IL in 2005, and got one game in the Norwegian Premier League.

References

Norwegian footballers
Tromsdalen UIL players
Tromsø IL players
Sportspeople from Tromsø
1984 births
Living people
Eliteserien players

Association football goalkeepers